Latarsha Rose is an American film and television actress, best known for her role as Portia in the 2012 film The Hunger Games.

Background
Rose is from Brooklyn, New York and attended Georgetown University. From the University, she performed in Theater productions for several years, before being chosen to be a part of Bravo TV’s The It Factor, a show which followed her and eleven other hopefuls as they "tried to make it in the entertainment business".

Career
Rose had roles in shows such episodic series as Law & Order, CSI: NY, Bones, CSI: Miami, All My Children, and The Cape, as well as recurring roles in the shows Windfall and Swingtown.  In 2012, after almost quitting the business, Rose was offered a role in The Hunger Games, as Portia, Peeta's stylist from the Capitol.  Rose also starred in the upcoming BET television series Being Mary Jane as Dr. Lisa Hudson, as Mary Jane's best friend.

When first cast in The Hunger Games, The Hollywood Reporter in May 2011, referred to her as a "relative unknown". In a 2002 article about actors, Time Magazine used her dimples as an example of how some actors might be initially cast for their physical characteristics.

Filmography

Film

Television

External links

References

Living people
Year of birth missing (living people)
American film actresses
African-American actresses
American television actresses
Place of birth missing (living people)
Georgetown University alumni
21st-century American actresses
People from Brooklyn
Actresses from New York City